Bembecia himmighoffeni is a moth of the family Sesiidae. It is found from the Iberian Peninsula, through Italy to the Dalmatian coast.

Adults are on wing from late July to August.

The larvae feed on Coronilla species, including Coronilla minima. There are also records for larvae feeding on Rumex species.

References

Moths described in 1866
Sesiidae
Moths of Europe